Dialium guineense, the velvet tamarind, is a tall, tropical, fruit-bearing tree in the flowering plant family Fabaceae. It has small, typically grape-sized, edible fruits with brown, hard, inedible shells.

Distribution
It grows in dense forests in Africa along the southern edge of the Sahel. In Togo it is called atchethewh.

The velvet tamarind can be found in West African countries such as Benin where it is called "Assiswè", Ghana where it is known as Yoyi, Sierra Leone where it is known as “”, Senegal, Guinea-Bissau where because of its texture is called "Veludo", Portuguese for velvet, and Nigeria where it is known as awin or igbaru in Yoruba, icheku in Igbo and tsamiyar biri in Hausa.

Uses
The bark and leaves have medicinal properties and are used against several diseases.

Fruit
Each fruit typically has one hard, flat, round, brown seed, typically 7-8 millimeters across and 3 millimeters thick. The seed somewhat resembles a watermelon seed (Citrullus lanatus). Some have two seeds. The seeds are shiny, coated with a thin layer of starch.

The pulp is edible and may be eaten raw or soaked in water and consumed as a beverage. The bitter leaves are ingredients in a Ghanaian dish called domoda.

Timber
Wood is hard and heavy and used for construction. The wood is also used for firewood and charcoal production

References

External links
 World Agroforestry
 

guineense
Fruits originating in Africa
Trees of Africa
Flora of West Tropical Africa
Flora of West-Central Tropical Africa